This is a list of episodes for @midnight that aired in 2016.

2016

January
The first week of the year, designated "Benson Bowl", is four consecutive new episodes featuring frequent winner Doug Benson.

February

March
The week of March 7–10 is the first Tournament of Champions, bringing together the comedians with the most wins throughout the show, culminating with the presentation of the "Two Girls, Won Cup" trophy.

April

May

June

July
{{Episode table |background=#181818 |aux1= 25 |aux2= 25 |aux3= 25 |aux1T = Winner |aux2T = Runner-up |aux3T = Last place |airdate = 20 |airdateR =  |country=US |overall = 5 |episodes=

{{Episode list|LineColor=181818
| EpisodeNumber = 431
| Aux1 = Ramon Rivas II*
| Aux2 = April Richardson and Dan St. Germain
| Aux3 = None
| ShortSummary = Due to The Daily Show'''s coverage of the final night of the Republican National Convention, this episode started at 12:47 AM (EST). Hardwick did not eliminate anyone because he "enjoys this panel a lot."
| OriginalAirDate = 
}}

}}

August
The week of August 15–18 is @midnight's Non-Trademark-Infringing International Competition for Gold, Silver, & Bronze Medals™, featuring comedians from nine different countries.

September
On August 22, 2016 @midnight began airing at 11:30 p.m. (EST), to serve as a temporary replacement for The Nightly Show with Larry Wilmore''. New episodes began premiering in this time slot on September 6, 2016. The week of September 19–22 was "sponsored" by Donald Trump (impersonated by Anthony Atamanuik), who stepped into the games at random intervals.

October

November

December

References

External links
 
 

2016 American television seasons